DXJC (92.1 FM), broadcasting as 92.1 Voice FM,  is a community radio station owned by Prime Broadcasting Network and operated by the Al-Balagh Foundation. The station's studio is located at the 3rd Floor, Jamiat Cotabato Bldg., Bubong Rd., Brgy. Datu Balabaran, Cotabato City.

References

Radio stations in Cotabato City
Radio stations established in 2015